The Piracy Act 1670 (22 & 23 Car 2 c 11) was an Act of the Parliament of England.

The whole Act was repealed by section 1 of, and the Schedule to, the Statute Law Revision Act 1966.

See also
Halsbury's Statutes
Piracy Act

References

Acts of the Parliament of England
1670 in law
1670 in England
Piracy law
Piracy in the United Kingdom